Manuel "Manu" Fuster Lázaro (born 22 October 1997) is a Spanish footballer who plays for Albacete Balompié as an attacking midfielder.

Club career
Fuster was born in Valencia, and was a Huracán Valencia CF youth graduate. On 23 July 2016, he signed for Tercera División side CD Olímpic de Xàtiva, and made his senior debut on 21 August by starting in a 2–0 away win against CD Buñol.

Fuster scored his first senior goal on 28 August 2016, netting the opener in a 2–0 home defeat of Muro CF. The following 4 August, after scoring 11 goals as his side missed out promotion in the play-offs, he joined CD Guijuelo in Segunda División B.

On 22 July 2019, Fuster agreed to a four-year contract with Albacete Balompié in Segunda División. He made his professional debut on 18 August, starting in a match against SD Huesca.

Fuster scored his first professional goal on 9 February 2020, netting a last-minute equalizer in a 1–1 home draw against SD Ponferradina. A regular starter in the 2020–21 season as the club suffered relegation, he was Albas top goalscorer with 12 goals in the 2021–22 campaign, as the club achieved promotion from Primera División RFEF.

References

External links
 
 
 

1997 births
Living people
Footballers from Valencia (city)
Spanish footballers
Association football midfielders
Segunda División players
Primera Federación players
Segunda División B players
Tercera División players
CD Olímpic de Xàtiva footballers
CD Guijuelo footballers
Albacete Balompié players